Troublesome is a ghost town in Smith County, Kansas, United States.

History
Troublesome was issued a post office in 1882. The post office was discontinued in 1894.

References

Former populated places in Smith County, Kansas
Former populated places in Kansas